Dune Messiah is a science fiction novel by American writer Frank Herbert, the second in his Dune series of six novels. A sequel to Dune (1965), it was originally serialized in Galaxy magazine in 1969, and then published by Putnam the same year. Dune Messiah and its own sequel Children of Dune (1976) were collectively adapted by the Sci-Fi Channel in 2003 into a miniseries entitled Frank Herbert's Children of Dune.

Plot

Twelve years have passed since the beginning of Paul "Muad'Dib" Atreides' rule as Emperor. By accepting the role of messiah to the Fremen, Paul has unleashed a jihad which conquered most of the known universe. Paul is the most powerful emperor ever known, but is powerless to stop the lethal excesses of the religious juggernaut he has created. Although 61 billion people have perished, Paul's prescient visions indicate that this is far from the worst possible outcome for humanity. Motivated by this knowledge, Paul hopes to set humanity on a course that will not inevitably lead to stagnation and destruction, while at the same time acting as ruler of the empire and focal point of the Fremen religion.

The Bene Gesserit, Spacing Guild, and Tleilaxu conspire to dethrone Paul, and the Guild Navigator Edric is able to use his own prescience to shield the plot from Paul's prescient visions. The Bene Gesserit Reverend Mother Mohiam has enlisted Paul's wife Princess Irulan, daughter of the deposed Padishah Emperor Shaddam IV. Paul has refused to father a child with Irulan, but he and his Fremen concubine Chani have also failed to produce an heir, causing tension within his monarchy. Desperate both to secure her place in the Atreides dynasty and to preserve the Atreides bloodline for the Bene Gesserit breeding program, Irulan has secretly been giving contraceptives to Chani. Paul is aware of this fact, but has foreseen that the birth of his heir will bring Chani's death, and does not want to lose her.

Edric gives Paul a gift he cannot resist: a Tleilaxu-grown ghola of the deceased Duncan Idaho, Paul's childhood teacher and friend, now called "Hayt". The conspirators hope the presence of Hayt will undermine Paul's ability to rule by forcing Paul to question himself and the empire he has created. Furthermore, Paul's acceptance of the gift weakens his support among the Fremen, who see the Tleilaxu and their tools as unclean. Chani, taking matters into her own hands, switches to a traditional Fremen fertility diet, preventing Irulan from being able to tamper with her food, and soon becomes pregnant. However, Chani's extended use of Irulan's contraceptive has weakened her, and endangers the pregnancy.

Otheym, one of Paul's former Fedaykin death commandos, reveals evidence of a Fremen conspiracy against Paul. Otheym gives Paul his dwarf Tleilaxu servant Bijaz, who, like a recording machine, can remember faces, names, and details. Paul accepts reluctantly, seeing the strands of a Tleilaxu plot. As Paul's soldiers attack the conspirators, others set off an atomic weapon called a stone burner, purchased from the Tleilaxu, that destroys the area and blinds Paul. By tradition, all blind Fremen exile themselves in the desert, but Paul shocks the Fremen and entrenches his godhood by proving he can still see, even without eyes. His oracular powers have become so developed that he can foresee in his mind everything that happens, so by moving through his life in lockstep with his visions, he can see even the slightest details of the world around him.

Bijaz, actually an agent of the Tleilaxu, uses a specific humming intonation to implant a command that will compel Hayt to attempt to kill Paul under certain circumstances. Chani dies in childbirth, and Paul's reaction to her death triggers Hayt, who attempts to kill Paul. Hayt's ghola body reacts against its own programming and Duncan's full consciousness is recovered, simultaneously making him independent of Tleilaxu control.

Chani gives birth to twins, who come into the world fully conscious with Kwisatz Haderach-like access to ancestral memories. The son is a total surprise for Paul, who had only foreseen the birth of their daughter. Scytale offers to revive Chani as a ghola, but Paul refuses to submit, considering the possibility that the Tleilaxu might program Chani in some diabolical way. The Face Dancer then threatens the infants with a knife to force Paul to accept, and also demands all of his CHOAM holdings in return. By successfully escaping the oracular trap and setting the universe on a new path, Paul has been rendered completely blind, yet he is able to kill Scytale with an accurately aimed dagger due to a psychic vision from his son's perspective. Later that evening Bijaz approaches Paul and repeats Scytale's offer, but is killed by Duncan on Paul's order. Now prophetically and physically blind, Paul chooses to embrace the Fremen tradition of a blind man walking alone into the desert, winning the fealty of the Fremen for his children, who will inherit his empire.

Paul leaves his sister Alia, now romantically involved with Duncan, as regent for the twins, whom he has named Leto and Ghanima. Alia orders the execution of Edric, Mohiam, and others involved in the plot against her brother, going against his wish that none of them should be hurt, but spares Irulan. Duncan notes the irony that Paul and Chani's deaths have enabled them to triumph against their enemies, and that Paul has escaped deification by walking into the desert as a man, while guaranteeing Fremen support for the Atreides line.

Publication history
Parts of Dune Messiah (and its sequel Children of Dune) were written prior to the completion of Dune itself. The novel appeared initially  as a five part serial in Galaxy Science Fiction magazine published from June (cover dated July) to October (cover dated November) 1969 with illustrations by Jack Gaughan. A Putnam hardback edition also appeared in October 1969. The American and British editions contain different prologues which summarized the events of Dune. Dune Messiah and Children of Dune were published in a single volume by the Science Fiction Book Club in 2002, and in 1979 by Gollancz with Dune and Children of Dune as The Great Dune Trilogy.

Analysis
Herbert likened the initial trilogy of novels (Dune, Dune Messiah, and Children of Dune) to a fugue, and while Dune was a heroic melody, Dune Messiah was its inversion. Paul rises to power in Dune by seizing control of the single critical resource in the universe, melange. His enemies are dead or overthrown, and he is set to take the reins of power and bring a hard but enlightened peace to the universe. Herbert chose in the books that followed to undermine Paul's triumph with a string of failures and philosophical paradoxes.

Critical reception
Galaxy Science Fiction called Dune Messiah "Brilliant ... It was all that Dune was, and maybe a little more." Spider Robinson enjoyed the book "even as [he] was driving a truck through the holes in its logic, because it had the same majestic rolling grandeur of the previous book." Challenging Destiny called the novel "The perfect companion piece to Dune ... Fascinating."

Adaptations
Dune Messiah and its sequel Children of Dune (1976) were collectively adapted by the Sci-Fi Channel in 2003 into a miniseries entitled Frank Herbert's Children of Dune. The first installment of the three part, six-hour miniseries covers the bulk of the plot of Dune Messiah. The second and third installments adapt Children of Dune.

Director Denis Villeneuve confirmed at the 2021 Venice Film Festival prior to the debut of his theatrical adaptation of Dune that a film based on Dune Messiah was planned, and it would serve as the third film in a trilogy. After Dune: Part Two (covering the second half of the first novel) was officially greenlit in October 2021, Villeneuve reiterated his hope to continue the series with a third film focusing on Dune Messiah. Screenwriter Jon Spaihts confirmed in March 2022 that Villeneuve still plans on a third film, and potential TV series spin-offs to continue the Dune saga.

References

External links
 
 Dune Messiah

1970 American novels
1970 science fiction novels
Novels by Frank Herbert
Sequel novels
Dune (franchise) novels
Novels first published in serial form
Works originally published in Galaxy Science Fiction